Box Hill & Westhumble is a railway station in the village of Westhumble in Surrey, England, approximately  north of Dorking town centre. Train services are operated by Southern who manage the station, and South Western Railway.
 
The station is the end point for the Thames Down Link long-distance footpath from Kingston upon Thames, and lies close to the midpoint of the Mole Gap Trail between Leatherhead and Dorking. The station is within  of the North Downs Way.

History

The station was constructed at the insistence of Thomas Grissell the owner of Norbury Park, in part compensation for the railway cutting across his land to the north of the village.  The main building was designed by Charles Henry Driver in the Châteauesque style and included steeply pitched roofs with patterned tiles and an ornamental turret topped with a decorative grille and weather vane. The building is currently in use as a private dwelling and commercial premises and is protected by a Grade II listing.

Grissell also obtained the right from the LBSCR to stop any train on request, a privilege subsequently exercised by Leopold Salomons, who purchased Norbury Park in 1890.  This concession was legally abolished by the Transport Act of 1962, however there is no evidence to suggest that it was regularly used after 1910.

The name of the station has changed many times over the years with "Box Hill" & "Boxhill" and "Westhumble" & "West Humble" used in varying combinations for signs, timetables and railway maps, with many inconsistencies. In 2006, after consultation with local residents, the station's name was changed to "Box Hill and Westhumble" from "Boxhill and Westhumble".

Services

Services at Box Hill & Westhumble are operated by Southern and South Western Railway using  and   EMUs.

The typical off-peak service in trains per hour is:
 1 tph to  via 
 1 tph to  via 

On Saturday evenings (after approximately 18:45) and on Sundays, there is no service south of Dorking to Horsham.

Terrier tank engine

A Terrier tank engine, built by the LBSCR in 1880, was named Boxhill after the station. It was used to haul commuter trains in South London and Surrey until the 1920s, when it was moved to become a shunting engine at Brighton. Unlike other engines of its class, its smokebox was not modified in the early 20th century, and it was restored by the Southern Railway in 1947 to its original condition and painted in its original Stroudley yellow ochre livery. It is now preserved at the National Railway Museum in York.

References

External links

Box Hill, Surrey
Railway stations in Surrey
Former London, Brighton and South Coast Railway stations
Railway stations in Great Britain opened in 1867
Railway stations served by Govia Thameslink Railway
Châteauesque architecture
Charles Henry Driver railway stations
Grade II listed railway stations
Railway stations served by South Western Railway